Phil Libin (born February 1, 1972) (was born in Leningrad, USSR in 1972, and moved to America when he was eight years old. He served as CEO of the Silicon Valley-based software company Evernote from 2007 to 2015, then became Executive Chairman of Evernote's board. In September 2015, Libin joined General Catalyst Partners as its fourth general partner in Silicon Valley. In September 2016, Libin stepped down as Executive Chairman of Evernote's board of directors to focus on his role at General Catalyst Partners.
Currently Libin runs the Startup "mmhmm" and the startup studio All Turtles.

Prior to joining Evernote, Libin founded and served as president of CoreStreet, a company that provided credential and identity management technologies to governments and large corporations. In 2009, CoreStreet was acquired by ActivIdentity, now owned by HID Global. Libin was also founder and CEO of Engine 5, a Boston-based Internet software development company acquired by Vignette Corporation (VIGN) in 2000 for $26 million. Post-acquisition, Libin served as principal architect and chief technologist for applications at Vignette.

Libin graduated from The Bronx High School of Science in 1989 and attended Boston University with a concentration in Computer Science, but left just before he was due to graduate to focus on his plans to launch a software company.

Libin has a chapter giving advice in Tim Ferriss' book Tools of Titans.

References

External links
Interview with Evernote CEO Phil Libin

Living people
Soviet emigrants to the United States
The Bronx High School of Science alumni
Boston University alumni
American businesspeople
Silicon Valley people
1972 births